The Brooks College of Health is a college at the University of North Florida. About 1,900 students are enrolled in the school, including undergraduate and graduate students. Brooks offers a Bachelor of Science in Nursing, Bachelor of Science in Dietetics and Nutrition, and Bachelor of Science in Health. Also offered are master's degree programs in Nursing, Nutrition, Public Health, Health Administration and Science Rehabilitation Counseling. The two Doctorate programs are in Nursing (DNP) and Physical Therapy (DPT).

Programs began in 1988 with Dr. Joan Farrell as the founding dean. The Brooks College of Health received its current name in 2006 in honor of retired Jacksonville physician and UNF benefactor Dr. J. Brooks Brown. Originally it was known simply as the College of Health.

J. Brooks Brown Hall

J. Brooks Brown Hall, Building 39, houses the college and opened in 1995. It is named in honor of Dr. J. Brooks Brown, a retired physician and UNF benefactor. A four-story addition opened in 2008 that includes Student Health Services, classrooms, x-ray & radiation laboratory, and administrative offices for the nursing program. The addition is a LEED certified green building.

References

External links
 Official website

Educational institutions established in 1988
University of North Florida
1988 establishments in Florida